Bridge of Earn railway station served the town of Bridge of Earn, Perthshire, Scotland from 1848 to 1965 on the Edinburgh and Northern Railway.

History 
The station opened on 18 July 1848 by the Edinburgh and Northern Railway. The old station was demolished in 1902. The second station closed on 15 June 1964 and closed to goods on 21 June 1965.

References

External links 

Disused railway stations in Perth and Kinross
Railway stations in Great Britain opened in 1848
Railway stations in Great Britain closed in 1964
Beeching closures in Scotland
1848 establishments in Scotland
1965 disestablishments in Scotland
Former North British Railway stations
Bridge of Earn